Ensuès-la-Redonne is a seaside commune in the Bouches-du-Rhône department in the Provence-Alpes-Côte-d'Azur region in Southern France. It is located on the Côte Bleue, 15 km (9.3 mi) west of Marseille, within the larger Aix-Marseille-Provence Metropolis. In 2019, it had a population of 5,783.

The commune was created in 1933 from parts of Châteauneuf-les-Martigues and Le Rove.

Transport
Ensuès-la-Redonne is served by the La Redonne-Ensuès TER PACA railway station (opened in 1915) on the Miramas–L'Estaque railway.

Demographics

See also
Communes of the Bouches-du-Rhône department

References

Communes of Bouches-du-Rhône
Bouches-du-Rhône communes articles needing translation from French Wikipedia